Iabu Rural LLG is a local-level government (LLG) of Madang Province, Papua New Guinea.

Wards
01. Baliau Ward
02. Dangale
03. Koalang
04. Boakure
05. Abaria
06. Warisi
07. Dugulaba
08. Budua
09. Madauri
10. Waia
11. Jogari
12. Yassa
13. Kuluguma
14. Boda
15. Boisa

References

Local-level governments of Madang Province